The Germanisches National Museum is a museum in Nuremberg, Germany. Founded in 1852,  it houses a large collection of items relating to German culture and art extending from prehistoric times through to the present day. The Germanisches National Museum is Germany's largest museum of cultural history.  
Out of its total holding of some 1.3 million objects (including the holdings of the library and the Department of Prints and Drawings), approximately 25,000 are exhibited.

The museum is situated in the south of the historic city center between Kornmarkt and Frauentormauer along the medieval city wall. Its entrance hall is situated on Kartäusergasse which was transformed by the Israeli sculptor Dani Karavan to the Way of Human Rights.

Name, establishment, guiding principles 

The Germanisches Museum, as it was named initially, was founded by a group of individuals led by the Franconian baron Hans von und zu Aufsess, whose goal was to assemble a "well-ordered compendium of all available source material for German history, literature and art".

The term Germanic should be understood in the historical context of the mid nineteenth century. In 1846, German linguists and historians, amongst them the Brothers Grimm, Leopold Ranke and Jacob Burckhardt, had met in Frankfurt, and decided to use "Germanistik" as a comprehensive term embracing all the fields of their academic disciplines related to the culture of German-speaking regions. The German revolutions of 1848–49 had failed to achieve a liberalised and unified Germany. Thus the name of the museum maintained the idea of a close cultural relationship within a region defined by the common German language, and a shared German cultural tradition. In 1852, the museum's intention to document the cultural unity of the German-speaking areas was a progressive concept, free from any exaggerated Chauvinism. Only in 1871, when the German Empire was constituted, the museum paid tribute to it by adding national to its name.

The museum understands itself as an important research and educational institution. As a national museum and a museum of the entire German-speaking region the German National Museum collects and maintains cultural, artistic and historical testimonials from the beginning of history to the present. As a research and educational institution of international standing, the collections, exhibitions and publications present the cultural history of the German-speaking countries in an international and interdisciplinary approach. The work of the institution is guided by the principle of respect for all cultures, so that all human beings can understand what the museum communicates, independent of their upbringing, education, and religious beliefs.

Buildings

The museum constitutes an architectural monument in itself, as it consists of a variety of buildings erected in different periods. It incorporates the remaining structures of the former Nuremberg Charterhouse, dissolved in 1525 and thereafter used for a variety of secular purposes until in 1857 what was left of these premises, by then badly dilapidated, was given to the museum. The charterhouse was rebuilt and modified to accommodate the collections until the late nineteenth century when Neo-Gothic extensions were added on its south side. During and after the First World War, the "Alter Eingang" (Old Entrance) and the "Galeriebau" (Gallery building) designed by German Bestelmeyer were built to provide an entrance from Kornmarkt and further space.

After the destructions during the Second World War, Sep Ruf designed additional buildings; historical parts of the halls and galleries were adapted to the new architectural concept or torn down after their destruction during the war; only some buildings were restored and rebuilt. The first major building was added 1955–1958, called "Heussbau" after the first president of West Germany, Theodor Heuss. In 1983, and from 1988 to 1993, the museum was substantially enlarged. The "Kartäuserbau" with the new entrance hall situated now on Kartäusergasse was designed by Jan Störmer of architects ME DI UM. In 1999, the 1910 building of the St Lorenz's parish children's home was acquired. It was restored in 2002, and is now the home for the Collection of Children's Toys.

Collection
The collection is displayed in the following sections (denominated here as by the GNM):

In the section History of the GNM, the painting Germania is displayed which was exhibited in St. Paul's Church, Frankfurt am Main in 1848.

Some random examples of the collection are shown here:

Gallery

Structure and organization

The Germanisches Nationalmuseum is a public law foundation supported by the Federal Republic of Germany, the state of Bavaria and the city of Nuremberg. Its Administrative Board is chaired by Klaus-Dieter Lehmann, the head of the General Directorate is G. Ulrich Großmann.

The museum also administrates the Collection of Children's Toys at St. Lorenz's parish, the Museum of the Emperor's Castle at Nuremberg Castle, as well as the Neunhof Palace, a Manor house located north of Nuremberg with its collection of hunting weapons and tools. The museum is organized as a public foundation since 1921. Since 2 July 1954, companies and individual persons (the "Fördererkreis") are invited to support the museum's activities.

As a research institute, the GNM conducts scientific and historical research on the material provided in the collections and archives. The research results are made public in scientific journals and exhibitions. Different long-time research projects are ongoing at the museum, including the "Schrifttum zur Deutschen Kunst" (German Art Literature project), and the Hessian Renaissance Stately Homes Online Catalogue.

References

External links

  
 Germanisches Nationalmuseum within Google Arts & Culture

Museums established in 1852
National museums of Germany
Art museums and galleries in Germany
Museums in Nuremberg
1852 establishments in Bavaria
1852 establishments in Germany